Extraction in chemistry is a separation process consisting of the separation of a substance from a matrix. The distribution of a solute between two phases is an equilibrium condition described by partition theory. This is based on exactly how the analyte moves from the initial solvent into the extracting solvent. The term washing may also be used to refer to an extraction in which impurities are extracted from the solvent containing the desired compound.

Types of extraction 
 Liquid–liquid extraction
 Acid-base extraction
 Supercritical fluid extraction
 Solid-liquid extraction
 Solid-phase extraction
 Maceration
 Ultrasound-assisted extraction
 Microwave-assisted extraction
 Heat reflux extraction
 Instant controlled pressure drop extraction (Détente instantanée contrôlée)
 Perstraction

Laboratory applications and examples 
Liquid-liquid extractions in the laboratory usually make use of a separatory funnel, where two immiscible phases are combined to separate a solute from one phase into the other, according to the relative solubility in each of the phases. Typically, this will be to extract organic compounds out of an aqueous phase and into an organic phase, but may also include extracting water-soluble impurities from an organic phase into an aqueous phase.

Common extractants may be arranged in increasing order of polarity according to the Hildebrand solubility parameter:

ethyl acetate < acetone < ethanol < methanol < acetone:water (7:3) < ethanol:water (8:2) < methanol:water (8:2) < water

Solid-liquid extractions at laboratory scales can use Soxhlet extractors. A solid sample containing the desired compound along with impurities is placed in the thimble. An extracting solvent is chosen in which the impurities are insoluble and the desired compound has at least limited solubility. The solvent is refluxed and condensed solvent falls into the thimble and dissolves the desired compound which then passes back through the filter into the flask. After extraction is complete the solvent can be removed and the desired product collected.

Everyday applications and examples 
Boiling tea leaves in water extracts the tannins, theobromine, and caffeine out of the leaves and into the water, as an example of a solid-liquid extraction.

Decaffeination of tea and coffee is also an example of an extraction, where the caffeine molecules are removed from the tea leaves or coffee beans, often utilising supercritical fluid extraction with CO2 or standard solid-liquid extraction techniques.

Further reading 
 Gunt Hamburg, 2014, Thermal Process Engineering: Liquid-liquid extraction and solid-liquid extraction, see , accessed 12 May 2014.
 G.W. Stevens, T.C., Lo, &  M. H. I. Baird, 2007, "Extraction, Liquid-Liquid", in Kirk-Othmer Encyclopedia of Chemical Technology, accessed 12 May 2014.
 T. Voeste, K. Weber, B. Hiskey & G. Brunner, 2006, "Liquid–Solid Extraction", in Ullmann's Encyclopedia of Industrial Chemistry, accessed 12 May 2014.
 R. J. Wakeman, 2000, "Extraction, Liquid-Solid", in Kirk-Othmer Encyclopedia of Chemical Technology, accessed 12 May 2014.
 M.J.M. Wells, 2000, "Essential guides to method development in solid-phase extraction," in Encyclopedia of Separation Science, Vol. 10 (I.D. Wilson, E.R. Adlard, M. Cooke, and C.F. Poole, eds.), London:Academic Press, London, 2000, pp. 4636–4643.
 Colin Poole & Michael Cooke, 2000, Extraction, in Encyclopedia of Separation Science, 10 Vols., accessed 12 May 2014.

See also 
 Sample preparation (analytical chemistry)
 Solvent
 Solvent impregnated resins
 Thin Layer Extraction
 Leaching (Chemistry)

References

Further reading

External links 
 

 
Analytical chemistry